Isabelle Boffey (born 13 April 2000) is a British middle-distance runner. A successful junior athlete, she won gold medals in the 800 metres at each of the three age-grade championships in European Athletics – at the 2021 European Under-23 Championships held in Tallinn, the 2019 European U20 Championships in Boras and the 2016 European U18 Championships in Tbilisi.

She first competed for her country as a senior in the women's 800 metres event at the 2021 European Indoor Championships held in Toruń, Poland, finishing sixth. In February 2022, she won the 1000 metres at the Birmingham Indoor Grand Prix.

In February 2023, the 22-year-old claimed a maiden national title, winning the 800 m at the British Indoor Championships.

Her personal bests for 800 metres are 2:01.24 outdoors (2021) and 2:00.25 indoors (2023).

References

External links
 

2000 births
Living people
British female middle-distance runners
Place of birth missing (living people)